Jules Ducret was a Swiss gymnast. He competed in the men's individual all-around event at the 1900 Summer Olympics.

References

External links

Year of birth missing
Year of death missing
Swiss male artistic gymnasts
Olympic gymnasts of Switzerland
Gymnasts at the 1900 Summer Olympics
Place of birth missing
Place of death missing